Krông Na is a commune in the Buôn Đôn District of Đắk Lắk Province, Vietnam, not far from the Cambodia border. The village lies in the centre of the Srepok River basin, within Yok Đôn National Park. The national park lies on the Ea Sup plain which dominates the landscape of the commune. The commune is home to festivals such as Buon Don Ethnic Traditional Cultural Festival and also hosts an elephant race.

References

Communes of Đắk Lắk province
Populated places in Đắk Lắk province